Raffaele Ioime (born 27 October 1987) is an Italian association football goalkeeper.

Club career

Early career 
Ioime initially began his youth career with Sicilian side Calcio Catania at a very young age, before spending parts of his youth career on loan with clubs such as Savoia, Brindisi, and Cosenza, where he earned starting positions at each of the three then-Serie D based clubs. He spent the entire 2005-06 Serie D season with Savoia, making 29 league appearances. He was then loaned out to  Brindisi ahead of the 2006-07 season and was the club's starting goalkeeper. He made 15 league appearances before returning to Catania in January 2007. His stay was only temporary though, as he was then loaned out to fellow Serie D outfit, Cosenza, where he also made 15 league appearances as the club's starting goalkeeper. He returned to Catania again on 30 June 2007.

Calcio Catania 
Ioime joined the 'Primavera youth squad of Calcio Catania at the age of 19 in 2007, and he was promoted into the senior squad in 2008, however, without making any appearance with the first team. He was successively sent out on loan to Lega Pro Prima Divisione side A.C. Legnano in July 2008 in order to gain some first team experience and he made a total of 21 appearances for the Lombardi club. On 30 June 2009, he returned to Calcio Catania but was one of seven goalkeepers on the books with the Etnei. Albano Bizzarri and Ciro Polito were sold, while Paolo Acerbis returned to U.S. Grosseto F.C. following his loan spell. Ioime was sent out in co-ownership to SPAL in July 2009, in order to play regularly. At SPAL he joined fellow Catania loanee Milan Bortel. During the 2009–2010 season, Ioime served as a reserve keeper to veteran Luca Capecchi.

FC UTA Arad 
In June 2010, the player's joint-ownership deal between SPAL 1907 and Calcio Catania was renewed, however he was later sold to Romanian Liga II side FC UTA Arad. He has served as the club's starting goalkeeper on 6 occasions in the league. At the conclusion of the 2010-11 season, Ioime was released.

Campobasso Calcio 
Following his adventure in Romania, Ioime returned to Italy following the 2010-11 season. He remained unattached for the first part of the season before being signed on a free transfer by Lega Pro Seconda Divisione side Campobasso Calcio in January 2012. He won a starting position at the club and would feature in 14 league appearances during the second half of the 2011-12 Lega Pro.

Latina Calcio 
In June 2012, Ioime has been acquired by U.S. Latina Calcio. During 2012–13 season, he served as backup to starting goalkeeper Giacomo Bindi, collecting 4 caps. U.S. Latina Calcio reached 3rd position in the tournament and moved to Serie B after winning the playoff finals.  He was indeed chosen as starting goalkeeper for Lega Pro Coppa Italia trophy, which was won by his team.

Esperia Viareggio 
On 7 July 2014, he joined Serie C side Viareggio.

Matera / Potenza 
He signed with the Serie C club Matera Calcio on 4 August 2018, but just two weeks later, on 17 August 2018, he moved again, this time to Potenza.

Triestina
On 19 August 2020 he joined Triestina on a 2-year contract.

References

External links 
http://www.goal.com/en/people/italy/18137/raffaele-ioime
http://www.calciatori.com/calcom/almanacco/calciatore.do?id=28069

1987 births
Footballers from Naples
Living people
Italian footballers
Association football goalkeepers
Catania S.S.D. players
A.C. Savoia 1908 players
S.S.D. Città di Brindisi players
A.S. Cosenza Calcio players
A.C. Legnano players
S.P.A.L. players
FC UTA Arad players
Latina Calcio 1932 players
S.S. Ischia Isolaverde players
Matera Calcio players
Potenza Calcio players
U.S. Triestina Calcio 1918 players
Serie C players
Serie D players
Liga II players
Italian expatriate footballers
Expatriate footballers in Romania